Dorian Boguță (born 24 April 1971) is a Moldovan-born Romanian actor. He appeared in more than thirty films since 1984.  In 2009, he made his directorial debut with the short film "10", marking the beginning of a series of successful short films, "De acum încolo" (2012), which won several awards including Best Romanian Short Film.

Selected filmography

References

External links 

1971 births
Living people
Moldovan male film actors